Clifford Taylor (1 August 1875 – 10 November 1952) was an English cricketer. He played for Gloucestershire between 1899 and 1900, and also played football for Clifton.

References

1875 births
1952 deaths
English cricketers
Gloucestershire cricketers
Clifton Association F.C. players
Cricketers from Bristol
English footballers
Association footballers not categorized by position